Uwe Schmidt (born 14 February 1966) is a German stevedore and politician of the Social Democratic Party (SPD) who has been serving as a member of the Bundestag from the state of Bremen since 2017.

Political career 
From 2015 until 2017, Schmidt served as a member of the State Parliament of Bremen.

Schmidt became a member of the Bundestag in the 2017 German federal election. In parliament, he is a member of the Committee for Food and Agriculture and the Committee on Transport and Digital Infrastructure.

Since 2022, Schmidt has been leading the Bundestag group of SPD parliamentarians from Northern Germany.

References

External links 

  
 Bundestag biography 

1966 births
Living people
Members of the Bundestag for Bremen
Members of the Bundestag 2021–2025
Members of the Bundestag 2017–2021
Members of the Bundestag for the Social Democratic Party of Germany